The Journal of Insect Science is a quarterly peer-reviewed scientific journal of entomology. It is published by the Indian Society for the Advancement of Insect Science since 1988. The journal is edited by Balbir Singh Joia.

Abstracting and indexing 
The journal is abstracted and indexed in BIOSIS Previews and The Zoological Record.

References

External links
 

Quarterly journals
Entomology journals and magazines
Publications established in 1988
English-language journals
Academic journals published by learned and professional societies of India